The 2016–17 Stanford Cardinal women's basketball team represented Stanford University during the 2016–17 NCAA Division I women's basketball season. The Cardinal, led by 31st year head coach Tara VanDerveer, played their home games at the Maples Pavilion and were members of the Pac-12 Conference. They finished the season 32–6, 15–3 in Pac-12 play to finish in a tie for second place. They defeated Washington State, Oregon and Oregon State to win Pac-12 women's tournament to earn an automatic bid to the NCAA women's tournament.

Earning a No. 2 seed in the Lexington region, they defeated New Mexico State and Kansas State in the first and second rounds. In the Sweet Sixteen, they defeated Texas 77–56. In the Elite Eight, they defeated Notre Dame 76–75 to reach their 13th Final Four in school history. At the Final Four in Dallas Texas, they were defeated by South Carolina 53–62. South Carolina would go on to beat Mississippi State for the national title.

Roster

Schedule

|-
!colspan=9 style="background:#8C1515; color:white;"| Exhibition

|-
!colspan=9 style="background:#8C1515; color:white;"| Non-conference regular season

|-
!colspan=9 style="background:#8C1515; color:white;"| Pac-12 regular season

|-
!colspan=9 style="background:#8C1515;"| Pac-12 Women's Tournament

|-
!colspan=9 style="background:#8C1515;"| NCAA Women's Tournament

Rankings

See also
2016–17 Stanford Cardinal men's basketball team

References

Stanford Cardinal women's basketball seasons
Stanford
Stanford
NCAA Division I women's basketball tournament Final Four seasons